Rugops (meaning ‘wrinkle face’) is a monospecific genus of basal abelisaurid theropod dinosaur from Niger that lived during the Late Cretaceous period (Cenomanian stage, ~95 Ma) in what is now the Echkar Formation. The type and only species, Rugops primus, is known only from a partial skull. It was named and described in 2004 by Paul Sereno, Jeffery Wilson and Jack Conrad. Rugops has an estimated length of 4.4–5.3 metres (14.4–17.4 ft) and weight of 410 kilograms (900 lbs). The top of its skull bears several pits which correlates with overlaying scale and the front of the snout would have had an armour-like dermis.

Discovery and naming

A skull pertaining to an abelisaurid was recovered during an expedition in 2000 led by Paul Sereno near In-Abangharit, Niger Republic. The specimen came from the Echkar Formation of the Tegama Group which dates to the Cenomanian stage of the Late Cretaceous period, 96 Ma. The formation has also yielded specimens pertaining to the carcharodontosaurid Carcharodontosaurus iguidensis, the spinosaurid Spinosaurus, an unnamed rebbachisaurid and titanosaur, and the crocodylomorphs Fortignathus, Laganosuchus and Kaprosuchus. The specimen was described in 2004 by Paul Sereno, Jeffery Wilson and Jack Conrad. The holotype specimen, MNN IGU1, consists of a partial skull which lacks portions of the palate and skull roof. The type specimen may represent a subadult individual based on its small size, the lack of fusion between the nasals and the presence of the fenestra between the prefrontal, frontal, postorbital and lacrimal bones.

The generic name, Rugops, is derived from the Latin word "ruga" (wrinkle) and the Greek word "opsi" (face). The specific name is derived from the Latin word "primus" (first). Both the generic and specific name refer to Rugops as being one of the earliest abelisaurids with a textured skull. 

In 2005, a partial right maxilla of an abelisaurid was described from the Kem Kem Group of Morocco. The maxilla shares some similarities with Rugops such as with the morphology of the teeth, the shape of the alveolar, the rugose texture on the lateral sides, the straight border with the premaxilla, and the position of the palatal shelf. However, the maxilla cannot be referred to Rugops as the diagnostic features of the genus are located on different parts of the skull.

Description 
 
In 2010, Gregory S. Paul gave Rugops an estimated length of 6 metres (19.7 ft) and weight of 750 kilograms (1,650 lbs). However, Grillo & Delcourt (2016) gave a lower estimate of 4.4 metres (14.4 ft) long while Molina-Pérez & Larramendi (2016) gave an estimate of 5.3 metres (17.4 ft) long and 410 kilograms (900 lbs) in weight.

Skull
 
The skull length of Rugops was about 31.5 centimetres (12.4 inches). As in other abelisaurids, the skull of Rugops has an external surface that is textured, a dental arcade that is U-shaped, maxillary-jugal contact that is broad, the presence of a socket on the maxilla and alveoli that are subrectangular in shape. The orbital brow is present on the skull, although it is not fully formed. Many of the bones that make up the skull have slender proportions. In addition, the skull also has relatively thin nasals and skull fenestrae the are proportionally large. The upper surface of each nasal bone has a row of several depressions with grooves for vascular supply going into them. A similar condition is seen in Carnotaurus, although the upper surface of the nasals is convex unlike Rugops, as it is concave. Sereno et al. (2004) suggested that the depressions on the dorsal surface of each nasal anchored either sensory structures or soft tissues for display. Delcourt (2018), however, interpreted that they correlate with overlying scales, as seen in extant reptiles such as crocodiles and lizards. The anterior-most snout has a papillate texture which indicates the presence of an armour-like dermis. The author suggested that, based on the type specimen probably being a subadult individual, the armour-like dermis may have reached a larger surface as it grew to which it developed a more papillate texture. Delcourt (2018) also proposed that the armour-like dermis may corelate with a low-motion headbutting behaviour, as seen in marine iguanas. 

A maxilla (NPSJB-PV247) from Patagonia shows similarities with Rugops as the pattern of external ornamentation is nearly identical and the internal details are also have a close similarity. In Rugops, the interdenticular sulci of the denticles, the presence of which might possible be a synapomorphic characteristic of Abelisauridae, is absent and has a higher dental formulae than in any other abelisaurid. The nasal sculpturing of Rugops is similar to the ornamentation seen in Skorpiovenator as the surface of the nasals show hummocky-like rugosities and has grooves that lead into each foramen. However, unlike Skorpiovenator, Rugops lacks extra foramina on the skull roof that could represent homologues. The external morphology of the nasals are similar to that of Skorpiovenator as they share a similar foramina pattern. The ventral surface of the nasals have a series of foramina, which has been suggested to connect to an internal system.

The describing authors indicated two distinguishing traits. Both of these are autapomorphies, unique derived characters. The skull roof has small fenestra that are present between the prefrontal, frontal, post-orbital and lacrimal. The dorsal surface of each nasal has a row of seven small depressions.

Classification
 
Sereno et al. (2004) initially found Rugops to be the basalmost abelisaurid,  a position also recovered by various analyses by Egli et al. (2016), Delcourt (2018), Cerroni et al. (2020) and Rolando et al. (2020). However, Rugops has also been recovered as being more derived than Rahiolisaurus and/or Eoabelisaurus but more basal than other abelisaurids by Pol & Rauhut (2012), Rauhut & Carrano (2016), and Iori et al. (2021). Other alternative positions include Rugops being more derived than Kryptops, Chenanisaurus and/or Spectrovenator as recovered by Sereno & Brusatte (2008), Zaher et al. (2020), Gianechini et al. (2021) and Agnolín et al. (2022), and within a polytomy with other abelisaurids such as Xenotarsosaurus, Tarascosaurus, Ilokelesia and Genusaurus which has been recovered by Tortosa et al. (2014), Baiano et al. (2020) and Salem et al. (2022).

A phylogenetic analysis conducted by Zaher et al. (2020) is reproduced below.

The results of an earlier analysis by Pol & Rauhut (2012) are reproduced below.

See also 
 Timeline of ceratosaur research
 2004 in paleontology

References

External links 
 Project Exploration on Rugops *Project Exploration news on Rugops
 Chicago Park District press release on Rugops, PDF format
 Sereno's speculation from "Science in Africa"
 Artist's impressions of Rugops, from Project Exploration
 Rugops in the Dino Directory

Abelisaurids
Late Cretaceous dinosaurs of Africa
Cenomanian life
Cretaceous Niger
Fossils of Niger
Fossil taxa described in 2004
Taxa named by Paul Sereno